Mukdahan Chaiyuenyong Football Club (Thai มุกดาหาร ไชยยืนยง เอฟซี), is a Thai semi professional football club based in Mukdahan province. The club currently play in Thai League 4 North Eastern Region.

Timeline

History of events of Mukdahan City Football Club

Stadium and locations

Season by season record

P = Played
W = Games won
D = Games drawn
L = Games lost
F = Goals for
A = Goals against
Pts = Points
Pos = Final position

QR1 = First Qualifying Round
QR2 = Second Qualifying Round
R1 = Round 1
R2 = Round 2
R3 = Round 3
R4 = Round 4

R5 = Round 5
R6 = Round 6
QF = Quarter-finals
SF = Semi-finals
RU = Runners-up
W = Winners

Players

Current squad

References

External links 
 Official Mukdahan City F.C. site
 Official Mukdahan Chaiyuenyong Facebookpage

Football clubs in Thailand
Association football clubs established in 2009
Sport in Mukdahan province
2009 establishments in Thailand